is a railway station operated by Nagoya Railroad located in Nishi-ku, Nagoya, Aichi, Japan. This station is unmanned.

Lines
Nagoya Railroad
Nagoya Main Line
Inuyama Line

Layout
The station has two side platforms serving two tracks.

Platforms

Adjacent stations

References

External links
 
 Station guide 

Railway stations in Japan opened in 1912
Stations of Nagoya Railroad
Railway stations in Aichi Prefecture